Erling Jevne (born 24 March 1966 in Lillehammer, Oppland) is a former Norwegian cross-country skier who competed from 1987 to 2005. He won two medals at the 1998 Winter Olympics in Nagano with a gold in the 4 × 10 km relay and a silver in the 30 km.

Jevne also won four medals at the FIS Nordic World Ski Championships with two golds (4 × 10 km relay: 1995, 1997) and two silvers (50 km: 1997, 4 × 10 km relay: 1999).

He also won the 50 km event at the Holmenkollen ski festival in March 1996. He also won six races between 10 km and 30 km, between 1994 and 2001.

Cross-country skiing results
All results are sourced from the International Ski Federation (FIS).

Olympic Games
 2 medals – (1 gold, 1 silver)

World Championships
 4 medals – (2 gold, 2 silver)

World Cup

Season standings

Individual podiums
 3 victories  
 12 podiums

Team podiums
 10 victories 
 17 podiums 

Note:  Until the 1999 World Championships, World Championship races were included in the World Cup scoring system.

References

External links
 9a at Åmot Secondary school interview with Jevne after the 1998 Winter Olympics in Nagano. 
 
 Holmenkollen winners since 1892 - click Vinnere for downloadable pdf file 

1966 births
Cross-country skiers at the 1992 Winter Olympics
Cross-country skiers at the 1994 Winter Olympics
Cross-country skiers at the 1998 Winter Olympics
Holmenkollen Ski Festival winners
Living people
Norwegian male cross-country skiers
Olympic cross-country skiers of Norway
Olympic gold medalists for Norway
Olympic silver medalists for Norway
Olympic medalists in cross-country skiing
FIS Nordic World Ski Championships medalists in cross-country skiing
Medalists at the 1998 Winter Olympics
Sportspeople from Lillehammer